Cuthbert is a masculine given name. Notable people with the name include:

Cuthbert of Canterbury (fl. 736–760), Archbishop of Canterbury
Cuthbert (fl. 780/790), scribe and artist of the eponymous Cutbercht Gospels
Cuthbert Bardsley (1901-1977), Anglican Bishop of Coventry
Cuthbert Brodrick (1821-1905), British architect
Cuthbert Bromley (1878-1915), English First World War officer and recipient of the Victoria Cross
Cuthbert Burbage (1566–1636), a key figure in the construction of the Globe Theatre in London
Cuthbert Burby (died 1607), London bookseller and publisher 
Cuthbert Burnup (1875-1960), English amateur cricketer and footballer
Cuthbert Christy (1863–1932), British doctor and zoologist, author of the Christy Report
Cuthbert Collingwood, 1st Baron Collingwood (1748-1810), Royal Navy vice admiral, one of the principal commanders of Battle of Trafalgar and Trafalgar Campaign
Cuthbert Constable (c. 1680–1746), English physician and antiquary
Cuthbert Dukes (1890–1977), English physician, pathologist and author
Cuthbert Ellison (British Army officer) (1698–1785), British Army officer and Member of Parliament
Cuthbert Ellison (Newcastle MP) (1783–1860), Member of Parliament
Cuthbert Grant (1793–1854), Métis leader in what is now Canada
Sir Cuthbert Headlam, 1st Baronet (1876-1964), British Conservative politician and several times Member of Parliament
Cuthbert Hurd (1911–1996), American computer scientist and entrepreneur
Cuthbert Mayne (1544-1577), English Roman Catholic priest and martyr
Cuthbert Nyasango (born 1982), Zimbabwean long-distance runner
Cuthbert Orde (1888-1968), British painter and First World War pilot
Cuthbert Ormond Simpkins (born 1947), physician and historian
Cuthbert Ormond Simpkins Sr. (1925–2019), dentist, Louisiana state legislator, and civil rights activist
Cuthbert Ottaway (1850-1878), English footballer and cricketer
Cuthbert Powell (1775-1849), U.S. Representative from Virginia
Cuthbert Sebastian (1921–2017), Governor-General of St. Kitts and Nevis
Cuthbert Sharp (1781–1849), English antiquary, official and soldier
Cuthbert Tunstall (1474-1559), Bishop of Durham, diplomat, administrator and royal adviser
Cuthbert Turner (1860–1930), English ecclesiastical historian and Biblical scholar
Cuthbert Woodroffe (1918-2012), Anglican Archbishop of the West Indies

Fictional characters:
Cuthbert (Microdeal), computer game character and the company mascot of the software company Microdeal
Cuthbert Allgood, a character in Stephen King's Dark Tower series
Cuthbert Binns, from the Harry Potter series by J. K. Rowling
Cuthbert Calculus, a scientist in Adventures of Tintin
Cuthbert Clare, a character in Thomas Hardy's Tess of the D'Urbervilles
Cuthbert Cringeworthy, in the comic strip The Bash Street Kids
Cuthbert Rumbold, from Are You Being Served?
J. Cuthbert Banks, from P.G. Woodhouse's The Clicking of Cuthbert
Grass snake Cuthbert, from the Lord Peter Wimsey short story Talboys by Dorothy L. Sayers

English masculine given names